The 2005 World Table Tennis Championships men's doubles was the 48th edition of the men's doubles championship.

Wang Hao and Kong Linghui won the title after defeating Timo Boll and Christian Süß in the final by four sets to one.

Seeds

  Chen Qi /  Ma Lin (semifinals)
  Wang Liqin /  Yan Sen (semifinals)
  Kong Linghui /  Wang Hao (champions)
  Ko Lai Chak /  Li Ching (third round)
  Karl Jindrak /  Werner Schlager (second round)
  Cheung Yuk /  Leung Chu Yan (quarterfinals)
  Lee Jung-woo /  Ryu Seung-min (quarterfinals)
  Michael Maze /  Finn Tugwell (third round)
  Timo Boll /  Christian Süß (final)
  Slobodan Grujić /  Aleksandar Karakašević (third round)
  Jörgen Persson /  Jan-Ove Waldner (second round)
  Chiang Peng-lung /  Chuang Chih-yuan (quarterfinals)
  Fedor Kuzmin /  Alexey Smirnov (third round)
  Peter Karlsson /  Jens Lundqvist (third round)
  Lucjan Błaszczyk /  Wang Zengyi (quarterfinals)
  Patrick Chila /  Damien Éloi (third round)

Finals

References

External links
 Main draw archived from ITTF.
 Players' matches. ITTF.
 WM 2005 Shanghai (China). tt-wiki.info (in German).

-